Hayange (Lorraine Franconian: Héngen/Haiéngen) is a commune in the Moselle department in Grand Est in north-eastern France.

Outlying villages include Marspich and Saint-Nicolas-en-Forêt, Konacker and Ranguevaux.

History 
Archaeological evidence indicates that iron ore was already mined here in Roman times.   Human settlement in the area during the Merovingian period is confirmed by a Merovingian cemetery discovered by iron miners in the Hamévillers Valley, on the edge of Hayange and along the line of a Roman road believed to have linked Rheims with Metz.

During the early Medieval period the town was known as "Heiyingen Villa",  a name indicating a settlement within a forested area. The first mention of the town in an official record dates from 821, during the reign of Louis the Pious, Western Emperor and King of the Franks, one of the sons of Charlemagne.

In 1941 during Nazi occupation, Reichswerke Hermann Göring founded Hüttenverwaltung Westmark GmbH to utilise the towns iron mine for manufacturing munitions, they used ordnance code ljy. Hayange was liberated by the American 357th Infantry (90th Division) after a short battle with the German 559th Grenadier Division on 10 September 1944.

Population

Economy 
Hayange is located in the iron manufacturing region of Lorraine; within Hayange is the former Sogerail plant, a railway rail manufacturer, dating to 1892 as Usine Saint Jacques.

Transportation 
Hayange is located at the crossroads of the D952 and the D13/57 near the A30.

Hayange railway station offers a daily link to Luxembourg and Metz.

Hayange has daily bus service to Luxembourg, Thionville and Metz.

Twin towns 
: Barga

Miscellaneous 
 Hayange's main educational institutions are: Lycée Les Grands Bois, Collège Hurlevent and LEP Maryse Bastié.
 The classical organist Vincent Warnier was born in Hayange on 14 October 1967.
Hayange features in the opening pages of the 2019 humorous travel book "The World Less Travelled".

See also 
 Communes of the Moselle department

References

External links 
 

Communes of Moselle (department)